In mathematics, if  is an associative algebra over some ground field k, then a left associative -bialgebroid is another associative k-algebra  together with the following additional maps:
an algebra map  called the source map, 
The corresponding counit  is required to be a left character (equivalently, the map  must be a left action extending the multiplication  along ). For a noncommutative , the tensor square  is not an algebra, hence asking for a bialgebra-like compatibility that  is a morphism of k-algebras does not make sense. Then one requires that the corestriction  is a homomorphism of unital algebras. As shown by Brzeziński and Militaru, the notion of a bialgebroid is equivalent to the notion of -algebra introduced by Takeuchi earlier, in 1977.

Associative bialgebroid is a generalization of a notion of k-bialgebra where a commutative ground ring k is replaced by a possibly noncommutative k-algebra . Hopf algebroids are associative bialgebroids with an additional antipode map which is an antiautomorphism of  satisfying additional axioms.

The term bialgebroid for this notion has been first proposed by J-H. Lu. The modifier associative is often dropped from the name, and retained mainly only when we want to distinguish it from the notion of a Lie bialgebroid, often also referred just as a bialgebroid. Associative bialgebroids come in two chiral versions, left and right. A dual notion is the notion of a bicoalgebroid.

There is a generalization, an internal bialgebroid which abstracts the structure of an associative bialgebroid to the setup where the category of vector spaces is replaced by an abstract symmetric monoidal category admitting coequalizers commuting with the tensor product.

References

External links
 nLab, Associative bialgebroid, https://ncatlab.org/nlab/show/bialgebroid
 Stjepan Meljanac, Zoran Škoda, Martina Stojić, Lie algebra type noncommutative phase spaces are Hopf algebroids, Lett. Math. Phys. 107:3, 475–503 (2017) http://dx.doi.org/10.1007/s11005-016-0908-9 http://arxiv.org/abs/1409.8188

Bialgebras